On 15 January 2019, a motion of no confidence in the government of Theresa May was tabled in the British House of Commons. On 16 January, the House rejected the motion by a vote of 325 to 306.

The motion was laid by Jeremy Corbyn, the Leader of the Labour Party and Leader of the Opposition, after the government had lost a Commons vote to secure parliamentary backing for the government's deal for Britain's withdrawal from the European Union by 230 votes on the evening of 15 January. That vote, 432 to 202 for rejecting the deal, represented the largest defeat for a sitting government in modern history.

The motion was debated on the afternoon of 16 January before it was voted on that evening. The vote went along party lines and was supported by all opposition parties and opposed by the ruling Conservatives and the Democratic Unionist Party, in accordance with their confidence and supply agreement.

After the result, Theresa May requested individual meetings with leaders of all parties to discuss how to continue with the process of leaving the European Union. The invitation was taken up by all leaders except Corbyn, who said he would not meet her unless she would ensure that a no-deal Brexit would not occur.

Background
The Conservative government elected in the 2017 general election was a minority government, relying on a confidence and supply agreement with the Democratic Unionist Party to give it a small working majority in the House of Commons.

In December 2018, May had faced a vote of confidence from members of the Parliamentary Conservative Party because of opposition from eurosceptic Conservative MPs to her Brexit withdrawal agreement, which they felt would compromise British control over its borders because its inclusion of the Irish backstop proposal, a proposal that would allow for the possibility of Northern Ireland remaining within the EU Customs Union as a means to avoid a physical border with the Irish Republic after Britain's departure from the EU. However, although May won the vote comfortably with a majority of 83, plans for the House of Commons to debate the Brexit agreement in December were postponed until the new year when it became clear Parliament would reject it.

On 17 December, after following May's decision to delay the vote, Corbyn tabled a motion of no confidence in her premiership but not against the government. The following day, the government refused to allow time for the motion to be debated, which Speaker John Bercow confirmed that it had no obligation to do.

Parliament then debated the Brexit agreement in January 2019, with the vote on whether to back May's plans taking place on 15 January. The deal was rejected by Parliament, with a majority of 230 voting against it. The result, 432-to-202 for rejecting the deal, represented the largest defeat for a sitting government in modern history. Addressing the House of Commons in the wake of the result,  May said that she would welcome a vote of confidence in her government and would allow time for it to be debated the following day. Corbyn then tabled a motion of no confidence in the government in the hope of triggering an early general election.

Proceedings
Leader of the House of Commons Andrea Leadsom said that the House's afternoon session on 16 January, following the conclusion of Prime Minister's Questions, would be dedicated to the debate, with a vote expected at around 19:00.

In accordance with the Fixed-term Parliaments Act 2011, the text of the motion was "That this House has no confidence in Her Majesty's Government". In addition to Corbyn, it was co-sponsored by Ian Blackford (SNP leader at Westminster), Vince Cable (Liberal Democrat leader), Liz Saville Roberts (Plaid Cymru), Caroline Lucas (Greens) and Nick Brown (Labour Chief Whip) and signed by a further 38 MPs.

Division
The motion was defeated by 325 votes to 306: a majority of 19. Ten DUP MPs and the independent MP Sylvia Hermon voted with the government. All the other parties in the Commons supported Labour's motion, as did some independent MPs, including Jared O'Mara and Stephen Lloyd. Three independent MPs, all formerly in Labour, abstained, as did Paul Flynn (Labour), who was too ill to vote, and in fact died one month later.

Aftermath
After the result, May told Members of the House of Commons she would "continue to work to deliver on the solemn promise to the people of this country to deliver on the result of the referendum and leave the European Union". As a result, she requested to meet leaders of all parties to have individual meetings on how to continue with the process of leaving the European Union. In reaction to the result, Corbyn asked May to ensure that a no-deal Brexit would not occur by telling MPs that the government should "remove clearly, once and for all, the prospect of the catastrophe of a no-deal exit from the EU". That idea of eliminating the possibility of a no-deal Brexit was backed by the SNP.

May made a statement to the nation from Downing Street at 22:00. In it, she urged MPs to "put self-interest aside" and "work constructively together" to achieve a solution to Brexit.

On the next day, it was reported that Chancellor of the Exchequer Philip Hammond had reassured executives from leading companies when he spoke to them for more than an hour at 9.30 p.m. on Tuesday that the government had no intention to have a no-deal Brexit occurring. He also said that a backbench motion could force the government to rescind Article 50. That would act as a "sort of ultimate backstop if the work the government is doing in seeking to find a way forward fails to deliver".

Corbyn also laid out conditions for the Labour party to support a second referendum. In a speech, he asserted, "If the government remains intransigent, if support for Labour's alternative is blocked for party advantage – and the country is facing the potential disaster of no deal – our duty will then be to look at other options which we've set out in our conference motion, including the option of a public vote". He also requested through the use of email that Labour MPs should not partake in any Brexit discussions with the government until May would rule out a no-deal Brexit after three Labour MPs (Hilary Benn, Yvette Cooper and John Mann) went to the Cabinet Office to meet Conservative ministers and discuss a solution to the crisis.

See also
List of votes of no confidence in British governments
2019 United Kingdom general election
Second May ministry

Notes

References

External links
House of Commons Hansard, 16 January 2019: No Confidence in Her Majesty’s Government
TheyWorkForYou, 16 January 2019: Business of the House (Today) — No Confidence in Her Majesty’s Government

2019 in British politics
May
January 2019 events in the United Kingdom
Consequences of the 2016 United Kingdom European Union membership referendum
Brexit
Theresa May